Bruce A. Menin (born c. 1962) is an American businessman. He is a managing principal of Crescent Heights, a real estate development company specializing in the development, ownership, and operation of residential and mixed-use real estate projects in the United States. Crescent Heights is based in Miami Beach, Florida, with regional offices in New York, Chicago, San Francisco and Los Angeles.

Early life and education
Menin was born in 1962 in Miami Beach, Florida, the son of Miriam (née Galbut) and Barry Menin. His father was a former stockbroker for Shearson Lehman Brothers and his mother was the owner of the Miami Beach Auto Tag Agency. Menin attended Miami Beach Sr. High School. He graduated cum laude from Harvard University, where he received a bachelor's degree in government; holds a Master's degree in Economics (with honors) from the University of Sydney in Australia, which he attended as a Rotary Scholar; and received a Juris Doctor degree from the Northwestern University School of Law, where he was Editor of the Law Review.

Career

Crescent Heights
Menin began his career as an associate at the New York law firm of Sullivan & Cromwell. He then became a principal in Crescent Heights' real estate development companies, with his cousin Russell W. Galbut and Sonny Kahn, in 1989. Together, they have invested in over 35,000 residential and hotel units across the nation. From 1989 to 1994, Menin and his partners expanded their condominium conversion business to become "South Florida's most prolific condo company," with projects in both South Beach and Miami. In 1994, Menin was the company principal responsible for the Broad Exchange Building, the first office to residential rental conversion in the Financial District of Lower Manhattan. In 1998, Menin oversaw the new construction condominium building in Los Angeles named The Remington.

Menin led the restoration and preservation of multiple historic buildings, beginning with several projects in the Miami Beach Architectural District during the 1990s. In Los Angeles, Menin is leading the preservation and restoration of the Hollywood Palladium and sponsored the nomination of the 1940s Streamline Moderne venue as a Los Angeles Historic-Cultural Monument.

Menin currently focuses on transit-heavy, multi-family properties in major cities building sustainable projects with "landscape art installations."

Notable deals
1997: Completed the first office to residential rental conversion in Lower Manhattan at 25 Broad Street.
2013: NEMA opens in Mid-Market, San Francisco and becomes a “catalyst for the neighborhood’s transformation”.
2013: Ten Thousand building (10000 Santa Monica Boulevard) receives city approval and cited by City Councilman Paul Koretz of Council District 5 as a “textbook example” of how development should be done.
2013: Acquired a building at 165 East 66th Street in Lenox Hill on the Upper East Side for US $230 million.
2015: Sold The Paris on the Upper West Side of Manhattan for $150 million.
2015: Received city approval to build first phase of Michigan and Roosevelt project in Chicago, known as 1200 S. Indiana, designed by Rafael Viñoly.
2016: Purchased 399 Congress Street in Boston’s Seaport district.
2016: Purchased North Harbor Tower in Chicago for an estimated US $200 million.
2016: Received initial approval to construct Palladium Residences, two 30-story mixed-use buildings at approximately 350 feet with 731 market-rate residential units and 24,000 square feet of retail space on Sunset Boulevard.
2016: Sold Walton on the Park in Chicago, Illinois to JDL Development.
2016: Construction completed in Rincon Hill, San Francisco on new development Jasper, dubbed the "smartest, most luxurious high-rise building to come along in America’s smartest city in decades.”
2017: Files plans for 70-story skyscraper with 794 apartments at 1045 Olive that would be the tallest residential building in Los Angeles.
2019: NEMA (Chicago), a 76-story, 800-unit tower will be the tallest residential apartment building in Chicago when it opens in May 2019.

Awards and honors
2006: Menin accepted the Freddie Mac Multifamily Development Firm of the Year award on behalf of Crescent Heights, awarded from the National Association of Home Builders.
2014: NEMA received the Market-Rate Residential Deal of the Year award from the San Francisco Business Times.
2014: NEMA received the IBcon ‘Digie’ Award for most intelligent multi-family residential building.
2015: NEMA received the Alliant Build America Merit Award.
2015: Jasper received the Market-Rate Residential Deal of the Year Award. 
2015: Jasper received the Best New Development award from San Francisco Apartment Associations.
2017: Ten Thousand received the 47th Annual Los Angeles Architectural Award by Los Angeles Business Council.

Philanthropy
Menin is Chairman Emeritus of the Lower East Side Tenement Museum in New York City. Under Menin’s leadership, the Museum acquired a building at the corner of Delancey and Orchard, which now houses the museum’s visitor center. Menin serves on the Board of StreetSquash, an afterschool academic support and physical fitness program in Harlem and Newark. He is also a Trustee of The Dalton School in New York City, and is currently Co-chair of its Centennial Capital Campaign and Chair of the Facilities Committee. Menin serves on the National Advisory Council for the Sean N. Parker Center for Allergy & Asthma Research at Stanford University.

Personal life
In 1999, he married Julie Jacobs in a Jewish ceremony at the Metropolitan Club. His wife went on to serve as the Commissioner of the New York City Department of Consumer Affairs and is now serving as the Commissioner of the Mayor's Office of Media and Entertainment under New York City Mayor Bill de Blasio.  She was also the Chairperson of Manhattan Community Board 1 for three consecutive terms starting in 2005.

References

External links
 www.crescentheights.com (Corporate Site)

Living people
People from Miami Beach, Florida
Harvard University alumni
University of Sydney alumni
Northwestern University Pritzker School of Law alumni
Businesspeople from Florida
American company founders
American real estate businesspeople
20th-century American Jews
1962 births
Sullivan & Cromwell associates
21st-century American Jews
20th-century American businesspeople
21st-century American businesspeople